St. Mary's Medical Center (SMMC) is a hospital in Huntington, West Virginia, USA.  With 393 beds, it is the second largest medical facility in the tri-state region wherein West Virginia, Ohio, and Kentucky meet following King's Daughters Medical Center in Ashland, Kentucky which has 465 beds.  The medical center is the largest private employer in Cabell County with over 2600 employees.

Academics
As a teaching facility associated with the Marshall University Joan C. Edwards School of Medicine, St. Mary's trains medical residents in several specialties. The hospital campus is home to the St. Mary's School of Nursing, the St. Mary's School of Radiologic Technology, and the St. Mary's School of Respiratory Care. All three programs are associated with Marshall University.  It is also the home to the Marshall University Physical Therapy program, which began in 2013.

In 2015, the hospital further affiliated with UK HealthCare's (University of Kentucky) Markey Cancer Center.

Centers

SMMC has centers in cardiac care, cancer treatment, an emergency department with a Level II Trauma Center and neuroscience.

History
On November 6, 1924, the Sisters of the Pallottine Missionary Society opened St. Mary's Hospital.  In August 2002, the hospital was renamed St. Mary's Medical Center. On July 9, 2012 St. Mary's opened a 24-hour-a-day, 7 day a week 12-bed Emergency Room in Ironton, Ohio. It contains acute and trauma rooms, imaging and lab services, and specialty doctors will rotate between the Ironton Campus and Huntington Campus.

In 2014, St. Mary's signed a definitive merger agreement with Cabell Huntington Hospital, forming Mountain Health Network.

Mission
The mission statement of the hospital is:

References

External links
Official Website

Hospital buildings completed in 1924
Hospitals in West Virginia
Pallottines
Christian hospitals
Buildings and structures in Huntington, West Virginia